Muhammad Shahabuddin Chuppu (born 10 December 1949) is a Bangladeshi jurist, politician and freedom fighter who is the President-elect of Bangladesh. He was nominated by the ruling Bangladesh Awami League as their candidate for the 2023 presidential election. He has served in numerous capacities, including as a district and sessions judge and a commissioner of the Anti-Corruption Commission.

Early life and education 
Chuppu was born on 10 December 1949 in the Jubilee Tank area in Shivrampur of Sadar Upazila of Pabna District in erstwhile East Bengal, Dominion of Pakistan (present-day Bangladesh). His parents were Sharfuddin Ansari and Khairunnessa.

Chuppu went to Pabna's Purbatan Gandhi School until he was admitted to Radhanagar Majumdar Academy at fourth grade. After passing SSC examination in 1966, he went to Pabna's Government Edward College and passed HSC and Bachelor's Degree from that college on 1968 and 1972, respectively. Between his HSC and B.Sc. exams, he actively participated in the Bangladeshi liberation movements and the liberation war, while he joined politics even before he passed HSC.

After passing B.Sc., he obtained postgraduate degree in Psychology from University of Rajshahi in 1974, and then LLB from Martyr Advocate Aminuddin Law College in 1975.

Career 
Chuppu was a student leader of the Awami League during the late 1960s and early 1970s. He was the Pabna District convenor of the Shadhin Bangla Chatro Shongram Parishad. He participated in the Liberation War as a freedom fighter. He was imprisoned after the assassination of Sheikh Mujibur Rahman in 1975 for three years.

In 1982, Chuppu joined as a Munsef (Assistant Judge) of the Judicial Department in the Bangladesh Civil Service (BCS). He was elected to serve as General Secretary of the Judicial Service Association in 1995 and 1996.

Chuppu was appointed by the Ministry of Law, Justice and Parliamentary Affairs to serve as a coordinator in the trial to prosecute the assassins of the Father of the Nation Bangabandhu Sheikh Mujibur Rahman. Shahabuddin served as Election Commissioner in the 2022 National Council of Bangladesh Awami League.

Presidency

Election 

Shahabuddin was nominated by the Awami League Parlimentary Party as their candidate for President of Bangladesh. On 12 February 2023, he submitted his application to the Chief Election Commissioner and the Presidential Election Officer at the Election Commission for the presidential election, the only candidate to do so. Upon filing his nomination, he stated "Everything is Allah's will". Shahabuddin then held a tête-à-tête with Prime Minister Sheikh Hasina at Ganabhaban. His nomination was welcomed by GM Quader of the opposition Jatiya Party who said "I congratulate him from my heart. I know him for a long time. He is a good person. I hope he would discharge the duty with sincerity for betterment of the country and the nation." while the Bangladesh Nationalist Party expressed their disinterest. On 13 February 2023, Shahabuddin was officially elected as the country's 22nd president as he was unopposed. The result was declared by the Chief Election Commissioner Kazi Habibul Awal. His nomination received an especially joyous response in his native Pabna.

Personal life 
Chuppu is married to Rebecca Sultana, a former joint secretary to the Government of Bangladesh. Together they have a son.

Legacy
In his honour, a park built by the Pabna Municipality in 2020 was named 'Bir Mukti Joddha Mohammad Sahabuddin Chuppu Amusement Park'.

References 

1949 births
Living people
People from Pabna District
Pabna Edward College alumni
University of Rajshahi alumni
Bengali Muslims
20th-century Bengalis
21st-century Bengalis
People of the Bangladesh Liberation War
Awami League politicians
Presidents of Bangladesh